Cameron Ocasio (born September 7, 1999) is an American actor who has played various roles in television series and films, such as Caught, Law & Order: Special Victims Unit, and Sinister. He was one of the stars of the Nickelodeon television series Sam & Cat in the role of Dice, for all 35 episodes. He is signed through the International Modeling and Talent Association.

Personal life
He has one older brother and one younger sister. He has a black belt in martial arts.

Filmography
Film

Television

Web

Theater

References

External links
 
 

1999 births
21st-century American male actors
Male actors from New York (state)
American male child actors
American male film actors
American male musical theatre actors
American male television actors
Living people
People from Long Island